Compound interest is the addition of interest to the principal sum of a loan or deposit, or in other words, interest on principal plus interest. It is the result of reinvesting interest, or adding it to the loaned capital rather than paying it out, or requiring payment from borrower, so that interest in the next period is then earned on the principal sum plus previously accumulated interest. Compound interest is standard in finance and economics.  

Compound interest is contrasted with simple interest, where previously accumulated  interest is not added to the principal amount of the current period, so there is no compounding. The simple annual interest rate is the interest amount per period, multiplied by the number of periods per year. The simple annual interest rate is also known as the nominal interest rate (not to be confused with the interest rate not adjusted for inflation, which goes by the same name).

Compounding frequency
The compounding frequency is the number of times per year (or rarely, another unit of time) the accumulated interest is paid out, or capitalized (credited to the account), on a regular basis. The frequency could be yearly, half-yearly, quarterly, monthly, weekly, daily, or continuously (or not at all, until maturity).

For example, monthly capitalization with interest expressed as an annual rate means that the compounding frequency is 12, with time periods measured in months.

The effect of compounding depends on:
 The nominal interest rate which is applied and
 The frequency interest is compounded.

Annual equivalent rate
The nominal rate cannot be directly compared between loans with different compounding frequencies. Both the nominal interest rate and the compounding frequency are required in order to compare interest-bearing financial instruments.

To help consumers compare retail financial products more fairly and easily, many countries require financial institutions to disclose the annual compound interest rate on deposits or advances on a comparable basis. The interest rate on an annual equivalent basis may be referred to variously in different markets as effective annual percentage rate (EAPR), annual equivalent rate (AER), effective interest rate, effective annual rate, annual percentage yield  and other terms. The effective annual rate is the total accumulated interest that would be payable up to the end of one year, divided by the principal sum.

There are usually two aspects to the rules defining these rates:

 The rate is the annualised compound interest rate, and
 There may be charges other than interest. The effect of fees or taxes which the customer is charged, and which are directly related to the product, may be included. Exactly which fees and taxes are included or excluded varies by country, may or may not be comparable between different jurisdictions, because the use of such terms may be inconsistent, and vary according to local practice.

Examples

 1,000 Brazilian real (BRL) is deposited into a Brazilian savings account paying 20% per annum, compounded annually. At the end of one year, 1,000 × 20% = 200 BRL interest is credited to the account. The account then earns 1,200 × 20% = 240 BRL in the second year.
 A rate of 1% per month is equivalent to a simple annual interest rate (nominal rate) of 12%, but allowing for the effect of compounding, the annual equivalent compound rate is 12.68% per annum (1.0112 − 1).
 The interest on corporate bonds and government bonds is usually payable twice yearly. The amount of interest paid (each six months) is the disclosed interest rate divided by two and multiplied by the principal. The yearly compounded rate is higher than the disclosed rate.
 Canadian mortgage loans are generally compounded semi-annually with monthly (or more frequent) payments.
 U.S. mortgages use an amortizing loan, not compound interest. With these loans, an amortization schedule is used to determine how to apply payments toward principal and interest.  Interest generated on these loans is not added to the principal, but rather is paid off monthly as the payments are applied.
 It is sometimes mathematically simpler, for example, in the valuation of derivatives, to use continuous compounding, which is the limit as the compounding period approaches zero. Continuous compounding in pricing these instruments is a natural consequence of Itô calculus, where financial derivatives are valued at ever increasing frequency, until the limit is approached and the derivative is valued in continuous time.

Discount instruments
 US and Canadian T-Bills (short term Government debt) have a different convention. Their interest is calculated on a discount basis as (100 − P)/Pbnm, where P is the price paid. Instead of normalizing it to a year, the interest is prorated by the number of days t: (365/t)×100. (See day count convention).

Calculation

Periodic compounding
The total accumulated value, including the principal sum  plus compounded interest , is given by the formula:

where:
A is the final amount
P is the original principal sum

r is the nominal annual interest rate
n is the compounding frequency
t is the overall length of time the interest is applied (expressed using the same time units as r, usually years).

The total compound interest generated is the final value minus the initial principal:

Example 1
Suppose a principal amount of $1,500 is deposited in a bank paying an annual interest rate of 4.3%, compounded quarterly. Then the balance after 6 years is found by using the formula above, with P = 1500, r = 0.043 (4.3%), n = 4, and t = 6:

So the amount A after 6 years is approximately $1,938.84.

Subtracting the original principal from this amount gives the amount of interest received:

Example 2

Suppose the same amount of $1,500 is compounded biennially (every 2 years). (This is very unusual in practice.) Then the balance after 6 years is found by using the formula above, with P = 1500, r = 0.043 (4.3%), n = 1/2 (the interest is compounded every two years), and t = 6 :

So, the balance after 6 years is approximately $1,921.24.

The amount of interest received can be calculated by subtracting the principal from this amount.

The interest is less compared with the previous case, as a result of the lower compounding frequency.

Accumulation function

Since the principal P is simply a coefficient, it is often dropped for simplicity, and the resulting accumulation function is used instead. The accumulation function shows what $1 grows to after any length of time.

Accumulation functions for simple and compound interest are

If , then these two functions are the same.

Continuous compounding

Continuous compounding can be thought of as making the compounding period infinitesimally small, achieved by taking the limit as n goes to infinity. See definitions of the exponential function for the mathematical proof of this limit. The amount after t periods of continuous compounding can be expressed in terms of the initial amount P0 as

Force of interest
As the number of compounding periods  tends to infinity in continuous compounding, the continuous compound interest rate is referred to as the force of interest .

In mathematics, the accumulation functions are often expressed in terms of e, the base of the natural logarithm. This facilitates the use of calculus to manipulate interest formulae.

For any continuously differentiable accumulation function a(t), the force of interest, or more generally the logarithmic or continuously compounded return is a function of time defined as follows:

This is the logarithmic derivative of the accumulation function.

Conversely:
 (since ; this can be viewed as a particular case of a product integral.)

When the above formula is written in differential equation format, then the force of interest is simply the coefficient of amount of change:

For compound interest with a constant annual interest rate r, the force of interest is a constant, and the accumulation function of compounding interest in terms of force of interest is a simple power of e:
 or

The force of interest is less than the annual effective interest rate, but more than the annual effective discount rate. It is the reciprocal of the e-folding time. See also notation of interest rates.

A way of modeling the force of inflation is with Stoodley's formula:  where p, r and s are estimated.

Compounding basis

To convert an interest rate from one compounding basis to another compounding basis, use

where
r1 is the interest rate with compounding frequency n1, and
r2 is the interest rate with compounding frequency n2.

When interest is continuously compounded, use

where
 is the interest rate on a continuous compounding basis, and
r is the stated interest rate with a compounding frequency n.

Monthly amortized loan or mortgage payments

The interest on loans and mortgages that are amortized—that is, have a smooth monthly payment until the loan has been paid off—is often compounded monthly. The formula for payments is found from the following argument.

Exact formula for monthly payment
An exact formula for the monthly payment is

or equivalently

where:
  = monthly payment
  = principal
  = monthly interest rate
  = number of payment periods

This can be derived by considering how much is left to be repaid after each month. The Principal remaining after the first month is

that is, the initial amount plus interest less the payment. If the whole loan is repaid after one month then
 so 
After the second month  is left, so

If the whole loan was repaid after two months,
 so 

This equation generalises for a term of n months, . This is a geometric series which has the sum

which can be rearranged to give

Spreadsheet formula 
In spreadsheets, the PMT() function is used.  The syntax is:

 PMT( interest_rate, number_payments, present_value, future_value, [Type] )
See Excel, Mac Numbers, LibreOffice, Open Office, Google Sheets for more details.

For example, for interest rate of 6% (0.06/12), 25 years * 12 p.a., PV of $150,000, FV of 0, type of 0 gives:

 = PMT(0.06/12, 25 * 12, -150000, 0, 0)
 = $966.45

Approximate formula for monthly payment
A formula that is accurate to within a few percent can be found by
noting that for typical U.S. note rates ( and terms =10–30 years), the monthly note rate is small compared to 1:

which suggests defining auxiliary variables

Here  is the monthly payment required for a zero–interest loan paid off in  installments. In terms of these variables the approximation can be written

The function  is even:

It follows immediately that  can be expanded in even powers of  plus the single term: 

It will prove convenient then to define

so that

which can be expanded:

The expansion

is valid to better than 1% provided .

Example of mortgage payment
For a $10,000 mortgage with a term of 30 years and a note rate of 4.5%, payable yearly, we find:

which gives

so that

The exact payment amount is  so the approximation is an overestimate of about a sixth of a percent.

Investing: monthly deposits
Given a principal (initial) deposit and a recurring deposit, the total return of an investment can be calculated via the compound interest gained per unit of time. If required, the interest on additional non-recurring and recurring deposits can also be defined within the same formula (see below).

  = Principal deposit
  = Rate of return (monthly)
  = Monthly deposit, and
  = Time, in months

The compound interest for each deposit is:

and adding all recurring deposits over the total period t (i starts at 0 if deposits begin with the investment of principal; i starts at 1 if deposits begin the next month) :

recognizing the geometric series:  and applying the closed-form formula (common ratio :) we obtain:

If two or more types of deposits occur (either recurring or non-recurring), the compound value earned can be represented as

where C is each lump sum and k are non-monthly recurring deposits, respectively, and x and y are the differences in time between a new deposit and the total period t is modeling.

A practical estimate for reverse calculation of the rate of return when the exact date and amount of each recurring deposit is not known, a formula that assumes a uniform recurring monthly deposit over the period, is:
 or

History

Compound interest when charged by lenders was once regarded as the worst kind of usury and was severely condemned by Roman law and the common laws of many other countries.

The Florentine merchant Francesco Balducci Pegolotti provided a table of compound interest in his book Pratica della mercatura of about 1340. It gives the interest on 100 lire, for rates from 1% to 8%, for up to 20 years. The Summa de arithmetica of Luca Pacioli (1494) gives the Rule of 72, stating that to find the number of years for an investment at compound interest to double, one should divide the interest rate into 72.

Richard Witt's book Arithmeticall Questions, published in 1613, was a landmark in the history of compound interest. It was wholly devoted to the subject (previously called anatocism), whereas previous writers had usually treated compound interest briefly in just one chapter in a mathematical textbook. Witt's book gave tables based on 10% (the then maximum rate of interest allowable on loans) and on other rates for different purposes, such as the valuation of property leases. Witt was a London mathematical practitioner and his book is notable for its clarity of expression, depth of insight and accuracy of calculation, with 124 worked examples.

Jacob Bernoulli discovered the constant  in 1683 by studying a question about compound interest.

In the 19th century, and possibly earlier, Persian merchants used a slightly modified linear Taylor approximation to the monthly payment formula that could be computed easily in their heads.

See also

 Credit card interest
 Exponential growth
 Fisher equation
 Interest
 Interest rate
 Rate of return
 Rate of return on investment
 Real versus nominal value (economics)
 Yield curve

References

Interest
Exponentials
Mathematical finance
Actuarial science

it:Anatocismo